Griffith Island is a small Antarctic island. It may also refer to:

 Griffith Island (Nunavut), in the Canadian Arctic
 Griffith Island (Georgian Bay), an island in Georgian Bay, Ontario, Canada

See also 
 Griffiths Island, a small island in Port Fairy, Victoria, Australia